Talsma is a Dutch surname. Notable people with the surname include:

 Hendrik-Jan Talsma (born 1978), Dutch public prosecutor and politician
 Marwin Talsma (born 1997), Dutch speed skater
 Roy Talsma (born 1994), Dutch footballer

Dutch-language surnames